Corporate haven, corporate tax haven, or multinational tax haven is used to describe a jurisdiction that multinational corporations find attractive for establishing subsidiaries or incorporation of regional or main company headquarters, mostly due to favourable tax regimes (not just the headline tax rate), and/or favourable secrecy laws (such as the avoidance of regulations or disclosure of tax schemes), and/or favourable regulatory regimes (such as weak data-protection or employment laws).

Unlike traditional tax havens, modern corporate tax havens reject they have anything to do with near-zero effective tax rates, due to their need to encourage jurisdictions to enter into bilateral tax treaties which accept the haven's base erosion and profit shifting (BEPS) tools.  CORPNET show each corporate tax haven is strongly connected with specific traditional tax havens (via additional BEPS tool "backdoors" like the double Irish, the dutch sandwich, and single malt). Corporate tax havens promote themselves as "knowledge economies", and IP as a "new economy" asset, rather than a tax management tool, which is encoded into their statute books as their primary BEPS tool.  This perceived respectability encourages corporates to use these IFCs as regional headquarters (i.e. Google, Apple, and Facebook use Ireland in EMEA over Luxembourg, and Singapore in APAC over Hong Kong/Taiwan).

While the "headline" corporate tax rate in jurisdictions most often implicated in BEPS is always above zero (e.g. Netherlands at 25%, U.K. at 19%, Singapore at 17%, and Ireland at 12.5%), the "effective" tax rate (ETR) of multinational corporations, net of the BEPS tools, is closer to zero.  To increase respectability, and access to tax treaties, some jurisdictions like Singapore and Ireland require corporates to have a "substantive presence", equating to an "employment tax" of approximately 2–3% of profits shielded and if these are real jobs, the tax is mitigated.

In corporate tax haven lists, CORPNET's "Orbis connections", ranks the Netherlands, U.K., Switzerland, Ireland, and Singapore as the world's key corporate tax havens, while Zucman's "quantum of funds" ranks Ireland as the largest global corporate tax haven. In proxy tests, Ireland is the largest recipient of U.S. tax inversions (the U.K. is third, the Netherlands is fifth). Ireland's double Irish BEPS tool is credited with the largest build-up of untaxed corporate offshore cash in history.  Luxembourg and Hong Kong and the Caribbean "triad" (BVI-Cayman-Bermuda), have elements of corporate tax havens, but also of traditional tax havens.

Economic Substance legislation introduced in recent years has identified that BEPS is not a material part of the financial services business for Cayman, BVI and Bermuda. While the legislation was originally resisted on extraterritoriality, human rights, privacy, international justice, jurisprudence and colonialism grounds, the introduction of these regulations have had the effect of putting these jurisdictions far ahead of onshore regulatory regimes.

Global BEPS hubs

Modern corporate tax havens, such as Ireland, Singapore, the Netherlands and the U.K., are different from traditional "offshore" financial centres like Bermuda, the Cayman Islands or Jersey.  Corporate havens offer the ability to reroute untaxed profits from higher-tax jurisdictions back to the haven; as long as these jurisdictions have bi-lateral tax treaties with the corporate haven.  This makes modern corporate tax havens more potent than more traditional tax havens, who have more limited tax treaties, due to their acknowledged status.  

The Cayman Islands, BVI, Bermuda, Jersey and Guernsey are more properly now known as IFCs or OFCs.

Tools

Tax academics identify that extracting untaxed profits from higher-tax jurisdictions requires several components:

Once the untaxed funds are rerouted back to the corporate tax haven, additional BEPS tools shield against paying taxes in the haven.  It is important these BEPS tools are complex and obtuse so that the higher-tax jurisdictions do not feel the corporate haven is a traditional tax haven (or they will suspend the bilateral tax treaties).  These complex BEPS tools often have interesting labels:

Execution

Building the tools requires advanced legal and accounting skills that can create the BEPS tools in a manner that is acceptable to major global jurisdictions and that can be encoded into bilateral tax-treaties, and do not look like "tax haven" type activity.  Most modern corporate tax havens therefore come from established financial centres where advanced skills are in-situ for financial structuring.  In addition to being able to create the tools, the haven needs the respectability to use them.  Large high-tax jurisdictions like Germany do not accept IP–based BEPS tools from Bermuda but do from Ireland.  Similarly, Australia accepts limited IP–based BEPS tools from Hong Kong but accepts the full range from Singapore.  

Tax academics identify a number of elements corporate havens employ in supporting respectability:

Aspects

Misnomer

Whereas jurisdictions traditionally labelled as tax havens, often having marketed themselves as such, modern Offshore Financial Centres robustly refute the tax haven label.  This is to ensure that other higher-tax jurisdictions, from which the corporate's main income and profits often derive, will sign bilateral tax-treaties with the haven, and also to avoid being black-listed.

This issue has caused debate on what constitutes a tax haven, with the OECD most focused on transparency (the key issue of traditional tax havens), but others focused on outcomes such as total effective corporate taxes paid.  It is common to see the media, and elected representatives, of a modern corporate tax haven ask the question, "Are we a tax haven ?"

For example, when it was shown in 2014, prompted by an October 2013 Bloomberg piece, that the effective tax rate of U.S. multinationals in Ireland was 2.2% (using the U.S. Bureau of Economic Analysis method), it led to denials by the Irish Government and the production of studies claiming Ireland's effective tax rate was 12.5%.  However, when the EU fined Apple in 2016, Ireland's largest company, €13 billion in Irish back taxes (the largest tax fine in corporate history), the EU stated that Apple's effective tax rate in Ireland was approximately 0.005% for the 2004-2014 period. The EU's position was found, on appeal in the EU's court, to be unsupported by the facts. However, the G7 leaders in the wake of reporting about a Microsoft subsidiary's level of taxation in 2020, have proposed an agreement on a global minimum corporate tax rate of 15%. 

Activists in the Tax Justice Network propose that Ireland's effective corporate tax rate was not 12.5%, but closer to the BEA calculation. Studies cited by The Irish Times and other outlets suggest that the effective tax rate is close to the headline 12.5 percent rate – but this is a theoretical result based on a theoretical "standard firm with 60 employees" and no exports: in reality, multinational businesses and their corporate structures vary significantly. It is not just Ireland, however.  The same BEA calculation showed that the ETRs of U.S. corporates in other jurisdictions was also very low: Luxembourg (2.4%),  the Netherlands (3.4%) and the US for multinationals based in other parts of the World.  When Gabriel Zucman, published a multi-year investigation into corporate tax havens in June 2018, showing that Ireland is the largest global corporate tax haven (having allegedly shielded $106 billion in profits in 2015), and that Ireland's effective tax rate was 4% (including all non-Irish corporates), the Irish Government countered that they could not be a tax haven as they are OECD-compliant.

Financial impact

It is difficult to calculate the financial effect of tax havens in general due to the obfuscation of financial data. Most estimates have wide ranges (see financial effect of tax havens).  By focusing on "headline" vs. "effective" corporate tax rates, researchers have been able to more accurately estimate the annual financial tax losses (or "profits shifted"), due to corporate tax havens specifically. This is not easy, however.  As discussed above, havens are sensitive to discussions on "effective" corporate tax rates and obfuscate data that does not show the "headline" tax rate mirroring the "effective" tax rate.

Two academic groups have estimated the "effective" tax rates of corporate tax havens using very different approaches:

They are summarised in the following table (BVI and the Caymans counted as one), as listed in Zucman's analysis (from Appendix, table 2).

Zucman used this analysis to estimate that the annual financial impact of corporate tax havens was $250 billion in 2015.  This is beyond the upper limit of the OECD's 2017 range of $100–200 billion per annum for base erosion and profit shifting activities.  These are the most credible  and widely quoted sources of the financial impact of corporate tax havens. 

The World Bank, in its 2019 World Development Report on the future of work suggests that tax avoidance by large corporations limits the ability of governments to make vital human capital investments.

Conduits and Sinks

Modern corporate tax havens like Ireland, the United Kingdom and the Netherlands have become more popular for U.S. corporate tax inversions than leading traditional tax havens, even Bermuda. 

However, corporate tax havens still retain close connections with traditional tax havens as there are instances where a corporation cannot "retain" the untaxed funds in the corporate tax haven, and will instead use the corporate tax haven like a "conduit", to route the funds to more explicitly zero-tax, and more secretive traditional tax havens.  Google does this with the Netherlands to route EU funds untaxed to Bermuda (i.e. dutch sandwich to avoid EU withholding taxes), and Russian banks do this with Ireland to avoid international sanctions and access capital markets (i.e. Irish Section 110 SPVs).

A study published in Nature in 2017 (see Conduit and Sink OFCs),  highlighted an emerging gap between corporation tax haven specialists (called Conduit OFCs), and more traditional tax havens (called Sink OFCs).  It also highlighted that each Conduit OFC was highly connected to specific Sink .  For example, Conduit OFC Switzerland was highly tied to Sink OFC Jersey.  Conduit OFC Ireland was tied to Sink OFC Luxembourg, while Conduit OFC Singapore was connected to Sink OFCs Taiwan and Hong Kong (the study clarified that Luxembourg and Hong Kong were more like traditional tax havens).

The separation of tax havens into Conduit OFCs and Sink OFCs, enables the corporate tax haven specialist to promote "respectability" and maintain OECD-compliance (critical to extracting untaxed profits from higher-taxed jurisdictions via cross-border intergroup IP charging), while enabling the corporate to still access the benefits of a full tax haven (via double Irish, dutch sandwich type BEPS tools), as needed.

We increasingly find offshore magic circle law firms, such as Maples and Calder and Appleby, setting up offices in major Conduit OFCs, such as Ireland.

Employment tax

Several modern corporate tax havens, such as Singapore and the United Kingdom, ask that in return for corporates using their IP-based BEPS tools, they must perform "work" on the IP in the jurisdiction of the haven.  The corporation thus pays an effective "employment tax" of circa 2–3% by having to hire staff in the corporate tax haven.  This gives the haven more respectability (i.e. not a "brass plate" location), and gives the corporate additional "substance" against challenges by taxing authorities. The OECD's Article 5 of the  MLI supports havens with "employment taxes" at the expense of traditional tax havens.

Irish IP-based BEPS tools (e.g. the "capital allowances for intangible assets" BEPS scheme), have the need to perform a "relevant trade" and "relevant activities" on Irish-based IP, encoded in their legislation, which requires specified employment levels and salary levels (discussed here), which roughly equates to an "employment tax" of circa 2–3% of profits (based on Apple and Google in Ireland).

For example, Apple employs 6,000 people in Ireland, mostly in the Apple Hollyhill Cork plant.  The Cork plant is Apple's only self-operated manufacturing plant in the world (i.e. Apple almost always contracts to 3rd party manufacturers).  It is considered a low-technology facility, building iMacs to order by hand, and in this regard is more akin to a global logistics hub for Apple (albeit located on the "island" of Ireland).  No research is carried out in the facility.  Unusually for a plant, over 700 of the 6,000 employees work from home (the largest remote percentage of any Irish technology company).

When the EU Commission completed their State aid investigation into Apple, they found Apple Ireland's ETR for 2004–2014, was 0.005%, on over €100bn of globally sourced, and untaxed, profits.  The "employment tax" is, therefore, a modest price to pay for achieving very low taxes on global profits, and it can be mitigated to the extent that the job functions are real and would be needed regardless.

"Employment taxes" are considered a distinction between modern corporate tax havens, and near-corporate tax havens, like Luxembourg and Hong Kong (who are classed as Sink OFCs).  The Netherlands has been introducing new "employment tax" type regulations, to ensure it is seen as a modern corporate tax haven (more like Ireland, Singapore, and the U.K.), than a traditional tax haven (e.g. Hong Kong).

U.K. transformation

The United Kingdom was traditionally a "donor" to corporate tax havens (e.g. the last one being Shire plc's tax inversion to Ireland in 2008). However, the speed at which the U.K. changed to becoming one of the leading modern corporate tax havens (at least up until pre-Brexit), makes it an interesting case (it still does not appear on all ).

The U.K. changed its tax regime in 2009–2013. It lowered its corporate tax rate to 19%, brought in new IP-based BEPS tools, and moved to a territorial tax system.  The U.K. became a "recipient" of U.S. corporate tax inversions, and ranked as one of Europe's leading havens.  A major study now ranks the U.K. as the second largest global Conduit OFC (a corporate haven proxy).  The U.K. was particularly fortunate as 18 of the 24 jurisdictions that are identified as Sink OFCs, the traditional tax havens, are current or past dependencies of the U.K. (and embedded into U.K. tax and legal statute books).

New IP legislation was encoded into the U.K. statute books and the concept of IP significantly broadened in U.K. law. The U.K.'s Patent Office was overhauled and renamed the Intellectual Property Office.  A new U.K. Minister for Intellectual Property was announced with the 2014 Intellectual Property Act.  The U.K. is now 2nd in the 2018 Global IP Index.

The U.K.'s successful transformation from "donor" to corporate tax havens, to a major global corporate tax haven in its own right, was quoted as a blueprint for type of changes that the U.S. needed to make in the Tax Cuts and Jobs Act of 2017 tax reforms (e.g. territorial system, lower headline rate, beneficial IP-rate).

Distorted GDP/GNP

Some leading modern corporate tax havens are synonymous with offshore financial centres (or OFCs), as the scale of the multinational flows rivals their own domestic economies (the IMF's sign of an OFC).  The American Chamber of Commerce Ireland estimated that the value of U.S. investment in Ireland was €334bn, exceeding Irish GDP (€291bn in 2016).  An extreme example was Apple's "onshoring" of circa $300 billion in intellectual property to Ireland, creating the leprechaun economics affair. However Luxembourg's GNI is only 70% of GDP.  The distortion of Ireland's economic data from corporates using Irish IP-based BEPS tools (especially the capital allowances for intangible assets tool), is so great, that it distorts EU-28 aggregate data.

This analysis completely ignores the fact that investors, businesses and governments routinely structure their deals in places like Cayman and the BVI as a risk reduction exercise for reasons of predictability of laws (based on English law), tax neutrality and a reliable and sophisticated commercial court system for dispute or enforcement in cases of default. 

There can appear a distortion meaning that all corporate tax havens, and particularly smaller ones like Ireland, Singapore, Luxembourg and Hong Kong, rank at the top in global GDP-per-capita league tables.  In fact, not being a county with oil & gas resources and still ranking in the top 10 of world GDP-per-capita league tables, is considered a strong proxy sign of a corporate (or traditional) tax haven. GDP-per-capita tables with identification of haven types are here . However, such statistics ignore the substance of global capital flows and investment. 

Ireland's distorted economic statistics, post leprechaun economics and the introduction of modified GNI, is captured on page 34 of the OECD 2018 Ireland survey:

This distortion leads to exaggerated credit cycles. The artificial/distorted "headline" GDP growth increases optimism and borrowing in the haven, which is financed by global capital markets (who are misled by the artificial/distorted "headline" GDP figures and misprice the capital provided).  The resulting bubble in asset/property prices from the build-up in credit can unwind quickly if global capital markets withdraw the supply of capital.  Extreme credit cycles have been seen in several of the corporate tax havens (i.e. Ireland in 2009-2012 is an example).  Traditional tax havens like Jersey have also experienced this.

Intellectual-property–based BEPS tools

Raw materials of tax avoidance

Whereas traditional corporate tax havens facilitated avoiding domestic taxes (e.g. U.S. corporate tax inversion), modern corporate tax havens provide base erosion and profit shifting (or BEPS) tools, which facilitate avoiding taxes in all global jurisdictions in which the corporation operates.  This is as long as the corporate tax haven has tax-treaties with the jurisdictions that accept "royalty payment" schemes (i.e. how the IP is charged out), as a deduction against tax.  A crude indicator of a corporate tax haven is the amount of full bilateral tax treaties that it has signed.  The U.K. is the leader with over 122, followed by the Netherlands with over 100.

BEPS tools abuse intellectual property (or IP), GAAP accounting techniques, to create artificial internal intangible assets, which facilitate BEPS actions, via:

IP is described as the "raw material" of tax planning.  Modern corporate tax havens have IP-based BEPS tools,  and are in all their bilateral tax-treaties.  IP is a powerful tax management and BEPS tool, with almost no other equal, for four reasons:

When corporate tax havens quote "effective rates of tax", they exclude large amounts of income not considered taxable due to the IP-based tools.  Thus, in a self-fulfilling manner, their "effective" tax rates equal their "headline" tax rates.  As discussed earlier, Ireland claims an "effective" tax rate of circa 12.5%, while the IP-based BEPS tools used by Ireland's largest companies, mostly U.S. multinationals, are marketed with effective tax rates of <0-3%.  These 0-3% rates have been verified in the EU Commission's investigation of Apple (see above), and other sources.

Encoding IP–based BEPS tools

The creation of IP-based BEPS tools requires advanced legal and tax structuring capabilities, as well as a regulatory regime willing to carefully encode the complex legislation into the jurisdiction's statute books (note that BEPS tools bring increased risks of tax abuse by the domestic tax base in corporate tax haven's own jurisdiction, see  for an example).  Modern corporate tax havens, therefore, tend to have large global legal and accounting professional service firms in-situ (many classical tax havens lack this) who work with the government to build the legislation.  In this regard, havens are accused of being captured states by their professional services firms.  The close relationship between Ireland's International Financial Services Centre professional service firms and the State in Ireland, is often described as the "green jersey agenda".  The speed at which Ireland was able to replace its double Irish IP-based BEPS tool, is a noted example.

It is considered that this type of legal and tax work is beyond the normal trust-structuring of offshore magic circle-type firms.  This is substantive and complex legislation that needs to integrate with tax treaties that involve G20 jurisdictions, as well as advanced accounting concepts that will meet U.S. GAAP, SEC and IRS regulations (U.S. multinationals are leading users of IP-based BEPS tools).  It is also why most modern corporate tax havens started as financial centres, where a critical mass of advanced professional services firms develop around complex financial structuring (almost half of the main 10 corporate tax havens are in the 2017 top 10 Global Financial Centres Index, see ).

The EU Commission has been trying to break the close relationship in the main EU corporate tax havens (i.e. Ireland, the Netherlands, Luxembourg, Malta and Cyprus; the main Conduit and Sink OFCs in the EU-28, post Brexit), between law and accounting advisory firms, and their regulatory authorities (including taxing and statistical authorities) from a number of approaches:

The "Knowledge Economy"

Modern corporate havens present IP-based BEPS tools as "innovation economy", "new economy" or "knowledge economy" business activities (e.g. some use the term "knowledge box" or "patent box" for a class of IP-based BEPS tools, such as in Ireland and in the U.K.), however, their development as a GAAP accounting entry, with few exceptions, is for the purposes of tax management. A lawyer said "Intellectual property (IP) has become the leading tax-avoidance vehicle."

When Apple "onshored" $300 billion of IP to Ireland in 2015 (leprechaun economics), the Irish Central Statistics Office suppressed its regular data release to protect the identity of Apple (unverifiable for 3 years, until 2018), but then described the artificial 26.3% rise in Irish GDP as "meeting the challenges of a modern globalised economy". The behaviour of the CSO was described as putting on the "green jersey".  Leprechaun economics an example of how Ireland was able to meet with the OECD's transparency requirements (and score well in the Financial Secrecy Index), and still hide the largest BEPS action in history.

As noted earlier, the U.K. has a Minister for Intellectual Property and an Intellectual Property Office, as does Singapore (Intellectual Property Office of Singapore).  The top 10 list of the 2018 Global Intellectual Property Center IP Index, the leaders in IP management, features the five largest modern corporate tax havens: United Kingdom (#2), Ireland (#6), the Netherlands (#7), Singapore (#9) and Switzerland (#10).  This is despite the fact that patent-protection has traditionally been synonymous with the largest, and longest established, legal jurisdictions (i.e. mainly older  G7-type countries).

German "Royalty Barrier" failure

In June 2017, the German Federal Council approved a new law called an IP "Royalty Barrier" (Lizenzschranke) that restricts the ability of corporates to deduct intergroup cross-border IP charges against German taxation (and also encourage corporates to allocate more employees to Germany to maximise German tax-relief).  The law also enforces a minum "effective" 25% tax rate on IP.  While there was initial concern amongst global corporate tax advisors (who encode the IP legislation) that a "Royalty Barrier" was the "beginning of the end" for IP-based BEPS tools, the final law was instead a boost for modern corporate tax havens, whose OECD-compliant, and more carefully encoded and embedded IP tax regimes, are effectively exempted.  More traditional corporate tax havens, which do not always have the level of sophistication and skill in encoding IP BEPS tools into their tax regimes, will fall further behind.

The German "Royalty Barrier" law exempts IP charged from locations which have:

One of Ireland's main tax law firms, Matheson, whose clients include some of the largest U.S. multinationals in Ireland, issued a note to its clients confirming that the new German "Royalty Barrier" will have little effect on their Irish IP-based BEPS structures - despite them being the primary target of the law.  In fact, Matheson notes that that new law will further highlight Ireland's "robust solution".

The failure of the German "Royalty Barrier" approach is a familiar route for systems that attempt to curb corporate tax havens via an OECD-compliance type approach (see ), which is what modern corporate tax havens are distinctive in maintaining.  It contrasts with the U.S. Tax Cuts and Jobs Act of 2017 (see ), which ignores whether a jurisdiction is OECD compliant (or not), and instead focuses solely on "effective taxes paid", as its metric.  Had the German "Royalty Barrier" taken the U.S. approach, it would have been more onerous for havens.  Reasons for why the barrier was designed to fail is discussed in complex agendas.

IP and post-tax margins

The sectors most associated with IP (e.g., technology and life sciences) are generally the some of the most profitable corporate sectors in the world.  By using IP-based BEPS tools, these profitable sectors have become even more profitable on an after-tax basis by artificially suppressing profitability in higher-tax jurisdictions, and profit shifting to low-tax locations.

For example, Google Germany should be even more profitable than the already very profitable Google U.S.  This is because the marginal additional costs for firms like Google U.S. of expanding into Germany are very low (the core technology platform has been built).  In practice, however, Google Germany is actually unprofitable (for tax purposes), as it pays intergroup IP charges back to Google Ireland, who reroutes them to Google Bermuda, who is extremely profitable (more so than Google U.S.).  These intergroup IP charges (i.e. the IP-based BEPS tools), are artificial internal constructs.

Commentators have linked the cyclical peak in U.S. corporate profit margins, with the enhanced after-tax profitability of the biggest U.S. technology firms.

For example, the definitions of IP in corporate tax havens such as Ireland has been broadened to include "theoretical assets", such as types of general rights, general know-how, general goodwill, and the right to use software.  Ireland's IP regime  includes types of "internally developed" intangible assets and intangible assets purchased from "connected parties".  The real control in Ireland is that the IP assets must be acceptable under GAAP (older 2004 Irish GAAP is accepted), and thus auditable by an Irish International Financial Services Centre accounting firm.

A broadening range of multinationals are abusing IP accounting to increase after-tax margins, via intergroup charge-outs of artificial IP assets for BEPS purposes, including:

It has been noted that IP-based BEPS tools such as the "patent box" can be structured to create negative rates of taxation for IP-heavy corporates.

IP–based Tax inversions

Apple vs. Pfizer–Allergan

Modern corporate tax havens further leverage their IP-based BEPS toolbox to enable international corporates to execute quasi-tax inversions, which could otherwise be blocked by domestic anti-inversion rules.  The largest example was Apple's Q1 January 2015 restructuring of its Irish business, Apple Sales International, in a quasi-tax inversion, which led to the Paul Krugman labeled "leprechaun economics" affair in Ireland in July 2016 (see article).

In early 2016, the Obama Administration blocked the proposed $160 billion Pfizer-Allergan Irish corporate tax inversion, the largest proposed corporate tax inversion in history, a decision which the Trump Administration also upheld.

However, both Administrations were silent when the Irish State announced in July 2016 that 2015 GDP has risen 26.3% in one quarter due to the "onshoring" of corporate IP, and it was rumoured to be Apple.  It might have been due to the fact that the Central Statistics Office (Ireland) openly delayed and limited its normal data release to protect the confidentiality of the source of the growth. It was only in early 2018, almost three years after Apple's Q1 2015 $300 billion quasi-tax inversion to Ireland (the largest tax inversion in history), that enough Central Statistics Office (Ireland) data was released to prove it definitively was Apple.

Financial commentators estimate Apple onshored circa $300 billion in IP to Ireland, effectively representing the balance sheet of Apple's non-U.S. business.  Thus, Apple completed a quasi-inversion of its non-U.S. business, to itself, in Ireland, which was almost twice the scale of Pfizer-Allergan's $160 billion blocked inversion.

Apple's IP–based BEPS inversion

Apple used Ireland's new BEPS tool, and "double Irish" replacement, the "capital allowances for intangible assets" scheme.  This BEPS tool enables corporates to write-off the "arm's length" (to be OECD-compliant), intergroup acquisition of offshored IP, against all Irish corporate taxes.  The "arm's length" criteria are achieved by getting a major accounting firm in Ireland's International Financial Services Centre to conduct a valuation, and Irish GAAP audit, of the IP.  The range of IP acceptable by the Irish Revenue Commissioners is very broad.  This BEPS tool can be continually replenished by acquiring new offshore IP with each new "product cycle".

In addition, Ireland's 2015 Finance Act removed the 80% cap on this tool (which forced a minimum 2.5% effective tax rate), thus giving Apple a 0% effective tax rate on the "onshored" IP.  Ireland then restored the 80% cap in 2016 (and a return to a minimum 2.5% effective tax rate), but only for new schemes.

Thus, Apple was able to achieve what Pfizer-Allergan could not, by making use of Ireland's advanced IP-based BEPS tools.  Apple avoided any U.S regulatory scrutiny/blocking of its actions, as well as any wider U.S. public outcry, as Pfizer-Allergan incurred.  Apple structured an Irish corporate effective tax rate of close to zero on its non-U.S. business, at twice the scale of the Pfizer-Allergan inversion.

Debt–based BEPS tools

Dutch "Double Dip"

While the focus of corporate tax havens continues to be on developing new IP-based BEPS tools (such as OECD-compliant knowledge/patent boxes), Ireland has developed new BEPS tools leveraging traditional securitisation SPVs, called Section 110 SPVs.  Use of intercompany loans and loan interest was one of the original BEPS tools and was used in many of the early U.S. corporate tax inversions (was known as "earnings-stripping").

The Netherlands has been a leader in this area, using specifically worded legislation to enable IP-light companies further amplify "earnings-stripping".  This is used by mining and resource extraction companies, who have little or no IP, but who use high levels of leverage and asset financing.  Dutch tax law enables IP-light companies to "overcharge" their subsidiaries for asset financing (i.e. reroute all untaxed profits back to the Netherlands), which is treated as tax-free in the Netherlands.  The technique of getting full tax-relief for an artificially high-interest rate in a foreign subsidiary, while getting additional tax relief on this income back home in the Netherlands, became known by the term, "double dipping".   As with the Dutch sandwich, ex. Dutch Minister Joop Wijn is credited as its creator.

Irish Section 110 SPV

The Irish Section 110 SPV uses complex securitisation loan structuring (including "orphaning" which adds confidentiality), to enable the profit shifting.  This tool is so powerful, it inadvertently enabled US distressed debt funds avoid billions in Irish taxes on circa €80 billion of Irish investments they made in 2012-2016 (see Section 110 abuse).  This was despite the fact that the seller of the circa €80 billion was mostly the Irish State's own National Asset Management Agency.

The global securitisation market is circa $10 trillion in size, and involves an array of complex financial loan instruments, structured on assets all over the world, using established securitization vehicles that are accepted globally (and whitelisted by the OECD).  This is also helpful for concealing corporate BEPS activities, as demonstrated by sanctioned Russian banks using Irish Section 110 SPVs.

This area is therefore an important new BEPS tool for EU corporate tax havens, Ireland and Luxembourg, who are also the EU's leading securitisation hubs.  Particularly so, given the new anti-IP-based BEPS tool taxes of the U.S. Tax Cuts and Jobs Act of 2017 (TCJA), (i.e. the new GILTI tax regime and BEAT tax regime), and proposed EU Digital Services Tax (DST) regimes.

The U.S. TCJA anticipates a return to debt-based BEPS tools, as it limits interest deductibility to 30% of EBITDA (moving to 30% of EBIT post 2021).

While securitisation SPVs are important new BEPS tools, and acceptable under global tax-treaties, they suffer from "substance" tests (i.e. challenges by tax authorities that the loans are artificial).  Irish Section 110 SPV's use of "Profit Participation Notes" (i.e. artificial internal intergroup loans), is an impediment to corporates using these structures versus established IP-based BEPS tools.  Solutions such as the Orphaned Super-QIAIF have been created in the Irish tax code to resolve this.

However, while Debt-based BEPS tools may not feature with U.S. multinational technology companies, they have become attractive to global financial institutions (who do not need to meet the same "substance" tests on their financial transactions).

In February 2018, the Central Bank of Ireland upgraded the little-used Irish L-QIAIF regime to offer the same tax benefits as Section 110 SPVs but without the need for Profit Participation Notes and without the need to file public accounts with the Irish CRO (which had exposed the scale of Irish domestic taxes Section 110 SPVs had been used to avoid, see abuses).

Ranking corporate tax havens

Proxy tests

The study and identification of modern corporate tax havens are still developing.  Traditional qualitative-driven IMF-OCED-Financial Secrecy Index type tax haven screens, which focus on assessing legal and tax structures, are less effective given the high levels of transparency and OECD-compliance in modern corporate tax havens (i.e. most of their BEPS tools are OECD-whitelisted).

Quantitative measures

More scientific, are the quantitative-driven studies (focused on empirical outcomes), such as the work by the University of Amsterdam's CORPNET in Conduit and Sink OFCs, and by University of Berkley's Gabriel Zucman.  They highlight the following modern corporate tax havens, also called Conduit OFCs, and also highlight their "partnerships" with key traditional tax havens, called Sink OFCs:

The only jurisdiction from the above list of major global corporate tax havens that makes an occasional appearance in OECD-IMF tax haven lists is Switzerland.  These jurisdictions are the leaders in IP-based BEPS tools and use of intergroup IP charging and have the most sophisticated IP legislation.  They have the largest tax treaty networks and all follow the  approach.

The analysis highlights the difference between "suspected" onshore tax havens (i.e. major Sink OFCs Luxembourg and Hong Kong), which because of their suspicion, have limited/restricted bilateral tax treaties (as countries are wary of them), and the Conduit OFCs, which have less "suspicion" and therefore the most extensive bilateral tax treaties.  Corporates need the broadest tax treaties for their BEPS tools, and therefore prefer to base themselves in Conduit OFCs (Ireland and Singapore), which can then route the corporate's funds to the Sink OFCs (Luxembourg and Hong Kong).

Of the major Sink OFCs, they span a range between traditional tax havens (with very limited tax treaty networks) and near-corporate tax havens:

However, this theory has a number of deficiencies. Base-shifting to evade or avoid taxes requires a legal mechanism – usually in the form of terms of a double tax treaty. Jurisdictions such as the Cayman Islands and BVI operate a Tax Neutral regime and have no Double Taxation Treaties; therefore, it has no legal mechanism to allow base-shifting. Moreover, in implementing Economic Substance legislation which was intended to address aggressive tax planning, Cayman and the BVI encountered very little impact, demonstrating that most of their business is in investment funds, or asset holding companies which were already tax resident onshore.

Ireland as global leader

Gabriel Zucman's analysis differs from most other works in that it focuses on the total quantum of taxes shielded.  He shows that many of Ireland's U.S. multinationals, like Facebook, don't appear on Orbis (the source for quantitative studies, including CORPNET's) or have a small fraction of their data on Orbis (Google and Apple).

Analysed using a "quantum of funds" method (not an "Orbis corporate connections" method), Zucman shows Ireland as the largest EU-28 corporate tax haven, and the major route for Zucman's estimated annual loss of 20% in EU-28 corporate tax revenues.  Ireland exceeds the Netherlands in terms of "quantum" of taxes shielded, which would arguably make Ireland the largest global corporate tax haven (it even matches the combined Caribbean triad of Bermuda-British Virgin Islands-the Cayman Islands). See .

Failure of OECD BEPS Project

Reasons for the failure

The rise of modern corporate tax havens, like the United Kingdom, the Netherlands, Ireland and Singapore, contrasts with the failure of OECD initiatives to combat global corporate tax avoidance and BEPS activities.  There are many reasons advocated for the OECD's failure, the most common being:

It has been noted in the OECD's defence, that G8 economies like the U.S. were strong supporters of the OECD's IP work, as they saw it as a tool for their domestic corporates (especially IP-heavy technology and life sciences firms), to charge-out US-based IP to international markets and thus, under U.S. bilateral tax treaties, remit untaxed profits back to the U.S.  However, when U.S. multinationals perfected these IP-based BEPS tools and worked out how to relocate them to zero-tax places such as the Caribbean or Ireland, the U.S. became less supportive (i.e. U.S. 2013 Senate investigation into Apple in Bermuda).

However, the U.S. lost further control when corporate havens such as Ireland, developed "closed-loop" IP-based BEPS systems, like the capital allowances for intangibles tool, which by-pass U.S. anti-Corporate tax inversion controls, to enable any U.S. firm (even IP-light firms) create a synthetic corporate tax inversion (and achieve 0-3% Irish effective tax rates), without ever leaving the U.S.  Apple's successful $300 Q1 2015 billion IP-based Irish tax inversion (which came to be known as leprechaun economics), compares with the blocked $160 billion Pfizer-Allergan Irish tax inversion.

The "closed-loop" element refers to the fact that the creation of the artificial internal intangible asset (which is critical to the BEPS tool), can be done within the confines of the Irish-office of a global accounting firm, and an Irish law firm, as well as the Irish Revenue Commissioners.  No outside consent is needed to execute the BEPS tool (and use via Ireland's global tax-treaties), save for two situations:

Departure of U.S. and EU

The 2017-18 U.S. and EU Commission taxation initiatives, deliberately depart from the OECD BEPS Project, and have their own explicit anti-IP BEPS tax regimes (as opposed to waiting for the OECD).  The U.S. GILTI and BEAT tax regimes are targeted at U.S. multinationals in Ireland, while the EU's Digital Services Tax is also directed at perceived abuses by Ireland of the EU's transfer pricing systems (particularly in regard to IP-based royalty payment charges).

For example, the new U.S. GILTI regime forces U.S. multinationals in Ireland to pay an effective corporate tax rate of over 12%, even with a full Irish IP BEPS tool (i.e. "single malt", whose effective Irish tax rate is circa 0%).  If they pay full Irish "headline" 12.5% corporate tax rate, the effective corporate tax rate rises to over 14%.  This is compared to a new U.S. FDII tax regime of 13.125% for U.S.-based IP, which reduces to circa 12% after the higher U.S. tax relief.

U.S. multinationals like Pfizer announced in Q1 2018, a post-TCJA global tax rate for 2019 of circa 17%, which is very similar to the circa 16% expected by past U.S. multinational Irish tax inversions, Eaton, Allergan, and Medtronic.  This is the effect of Pfizer being able to use the new U.S. 13.125% FDII regime, as well as the new U.S. BEAT regime penalising non-U.S. multinationals (and past tax inversions) by taxing income leaving the U.S. to go to low-tax corporate tax havens like Ireland.

Other jurisdictions, such as Japan, are also realising the extent to which IP-based BEPS tools are being used to manage global corporate taxes.

U.S. as BEPS winner

While the IRS has traditionally been seen as the main loser to global corporate tax havens, the 15.5% repatriation rate of the Trump administration Tax Cuts and Jobs Act of 2017 changes this calculus.

IP-heavy American corporations are the main users of BEPS tools.  Studies show that as most other major economies run "territorial" tax systems, their corporates did not need to profit shift.  They could just sell their IP to foreign markets from their home jurisdiction at low tax rates (e.g. 5% in Germany for German corporations).  For example, there are no non-U.S./non-U.K. foreign corporates in Ireland's top 50 firms by revenues, and only one by employees, German retailer Lidl (whereas 14 of Ireland's top 20 firms are American multinationals).  The British firms are mainly pre .  (discussed here).

Had American multinationals not used IP-based BEPS tools in corporate tax havens, and paid the circa 25% corporation tax (average OECD rate) abroad, the IRS would have only received an additional 10% in tax, to bring the total effective American worldwide tax rate to 35%. However, after the TCJA, the IRS is now getting more tax, at the higher 15.5% rate, and American corporations have avoided the 25% foreign taxes and therefore will have brought more capital back to America as result.

This is at the expense of higher-tax Europe and Asian countries, who received no taxes from American corporations, as the corporations used IP-based BEPS tools from bases in corporate tax havens, while German corporations are charged 5% tax by their regulator.

President Trump did not sign the OECD's June 2017 Multilateral Convention to Implement Tax Treaty Related Measures to Prevent Base Erosion and Profit Shifting, as it felt that it had low exposure to profit shifting. An American official said at a transfer pricing conference that they did not sign the tax treaty inked by 68 [later 70] countries in Paris 7 June 2017 "because the U.S. tax treaty network has a low degree of exposure to base erosion and profit shifting issues." This beneficial effect of global tax havens to the IRS was predicted by Hines and Rice in 1994 in which the authors said: "some American business operations are drawn offshore by the lure of low tax rates in tax havens; nevertheless, the policies of tax havens may, on net, enhance the U.S. Treasury's ability to collect tax revenue from American corporations."

Corporate tax haven lists

Types of corporate tax haven lists

Before 2015, many lists are of general tax havens (i.e. individual and corporate).  Post 2015, quantitative studies (e.g. CORPNET and Gabriel Zucman), have highlighted the greater scale of corporate tax haven activity.  The OECD, who only list one jurisdiction in the world as a tax haven, Trinidad and Tobago, note the scale of corporate tax haven activity.  Note that the IMF list of offshore financial centres ("OFC") is often cited as the first list to include the main corporate tax havens and the term OFC and corporate tax haven are often used interchangeably.

Ten major corporate tax havens

Regardless of method, most corporate tax haven lists consistently repeat ten jurisdictions (sometimes the Caribbean "triad" is one group), which comprise: 

Note four of these ten jurisdictions have financial centres that appear in 2017 top 10 Global Financial Centres Index: London, Hong Kong, Singapore, and Zurich.  Luxembourg was in the top 15.

Note also from Conduit and Sink OFCs, that the latter groups (ii ex. Switzerland, and iii), rely on the first group (i), to act as a conduit in rerouting corporate untaxed income.  In this regard, Ireland, the Netherlands, Singapore and the U.K., are considered the most important corporate tax havens, and the "source" of most global corporate tax avoidance.

Because of their larger size, it is not uncommon to see Switzerland and the United Kingdom dropped from more informal references to the main tax havens, for example:

Hines Corporate tax havens

James R. Hines Jr. is a founder of research into tax havens.  His area of expertise is the U.S. corporate taxation system, and much of his research is on U.S. multinational use of tax havens.  In 2010, Hines produced a table of U.S. multinational investment in havens, and produced the following ranking of the ten largest U.S. corporate tax havens:

Zucman Corporate tax havens

Tax haven academic Gabriel Zucman's (et alia) June 2018 list calculates the actual quantum of actual taxes shielded (versus counting legal Orbis database connections, or company subsidiaries) by profit shifting.  Ireland now exceeds the aggregate Caribbean complex (ex. Bermuda), in terms of being the largest overall global corporate tax haven (see ).  Ireland is also the largest EU-28 corporate tax haven.  The study estimates Ireland's effective tax rate is really 4%. The U.K. is a notable absence. (slide 68).

CORPNET Corporate tax havens

From the 2017 investigation, published in Nature, into Conduit and Sink OFCs, comes CORPNET's top 5 Conduit OFCs (i.e. corporate tax haven proxy), and top 5 Sink OFCs (i.e. traditional tax haven proxy), as calculated by analysing over 71 million global corporate connections on the Orbis database (i.e. it is by number of connections, not specifically by quantum of taxes shielded).  Even though the method is different, CORPNET captures all of Zucman's list but separated into Conduits and Sinks (and breaks out the Caribbean), however, Zucman's list has a different ranking:

Conduit OFCs (by the number of corporate connections), 2017:

Sink OFCs (by the number of corporate connections), 2017:

ITEP Corporate tax havens
The first Institute on Taxation and Economic Policy list (Figure 1, page 11), is based on the % of Fortune 500 companies with subsidiaries in the corporate tax haven in 2016.  The drawback of the list is that it is a  U.S. focused list, and focuses on the number of connections (i.e. or subsidiaries) rather than the scale of taxes shielded. Contains all of Zucman's list, but with Mauritius and Panama added as well.

Percentage of Fortune 500 companies with subsidiaries in the jurisdiction, 2016:

The second Institute on Taxation and Economic Policy list (Figure 4, page 16), is based on the reported profits of U.S. Fortune 500 controlled subsidiaries in 2013.  It tries to capture the scale of taxes shielded by looking at reported profits as a proxy.  Ireland now jumps to 2nd place, only just behind the Netherlands. The Netherlands-Ireland-Bermuda are usually the jurisdictions behind most "double Irish with a Dutch sandwich" BEPS schemes.  Identical list to Zucman's list but with the Caribbean broken out into individual jurisdictions (the Caymans, Bermuda, Bahamas and the BVI).

Size of profits routed by Fortune 500 companies via subsidiaries in the jurisdiction, 2016:

Bloomberg Corporate tax inversions

A simple but effective proxy are the destinations to where U.S. multinationals execute tax inversions (i.e. an important test of the attractiveness of a corporate tax haven).  However, cases like inversions to Canada could reflect more of a "relative-tax" view (i.e. Canada offers lower taxes than the U.S. and it is close by and less controversial), than an "absolute-tax" view on the best global locations for a corporate tax haven.  The list still captures much of Zucman's list, particularly for the EU and the Caribbean. It captures the popularity of Ireland and the rise of the U.K.

Destinations for the 85 U.S. corporate inversions, since the first inversion in 1982, to the most recent inversion in 2016:

GDP-per-capita tax haven proxy

One of the simpler, but effective, methods proposed of identifying tax havens (both corporate and traditional) is by tracking the distortion that the tax-driven accounting flows make on national economic flows. The following tables of the world's top 15 GDP-per-capita jurisdictions are taken from the List of countries by GDP (PPP) per capita for 2017 (from the IMF) and 2016 (from the World Bank).

See also

Corporate tax inversion
Corporate tax in the Netherlands
Corporation tax in the Republic of Ireland
Double Irish IP-based BEPS tool
Single Malt IP-based BEPS tool
Capital Allowances for Intangible Assets IP-based BEPS tool
Dutch sandwich IP-based BEPS tool
Ireland as a tax haven
Irish Section 110 Special Purpose Vehicle (SPV) Debt-based BEPS tool
Offshore financial centre
Qualifying investor alternative investment fund (QIAIF) Tax-free shelters
Taxation in Switzerland
United Kingdom corporation tax
Matheson (law firm) Ireland's largest U.S. tax advisor
Feargal O'Rourke architect of Ireland's BEPS tools

Notes

External links 
International Financial Centres Forum (IFC Forum)
IMF Offshore Financial Centres
Taxing Corporations, the Tax Justice Network
Corporate Tax Havens, the Guardian

International taxation
Tax avoidance
Business terms
Corporate law
Corporate tax avoidance
Global issues